Pile Gully is a rural locality in the North Burnett Region, Queensland, Australia.

Geography 
The eastern part of the locality is lower land and used for grazing, while the western part is more mountainous and undeveloped. The very northern part of the locality is within the Malmaison State Forest while the south-western and southern parts of the locality are within the Pile Gully State Forest which extends into neighbouring Old Cooranga.

Education 
There are no schools in Pile Gully. The nearest primary and secondary schooling is in Gayndah.

References 

North Burnett Region
Localities in Queensland